Renee Gadd (22 June 1908 – 20 July 2003) was an Argentine-born British film actress. She acted mostly in British films.

Early life
Gadd was born on a ranch in Bahía Blanca, Argentina in 1908 to immigrants from Jersey. Her father Talbot Gadd was a railway executive who abandoned the family, after which they moved to England in 1913. Gadd lived with her aunt and began to study dancing, working as a chorus girl in Brighton by the age of fourteen. In 1924, she was cast in a production of Hassan by the powerful theatrical agent Basil Dean, after which she appeared in several musical comedies, then straight plays after becoming a member of a Shakespearian company at Stratford-on-Avon. She enjoyed a series of successful West End roles. During this same period she acted, and had an affair, with Fred Astaire.

Film career
In 1931 Gadd signed a contract with British International Pictures and spent two years making films for them. Finding the various comedy films she was cast in uninspiring she behaved uncooperatively until she was released from her contract. In 1932 while working on the crime film White Face she began a tempestuous affair with her co-star Hugh Williams. When her contract with British International expired in 1934 she followed Williams who had gone to Hollywood, but found he had a new lover. She appeared opposite him in the 1935 film David Copperfield, but returned to Britain the following year. Her career began to tail off and she appeared mostly in quota quickies and small roles in minor productions for the remainder of her career. Her final appearance was in the 1950 Ealing Studios film The Blue Lamp.

Partial filmography

 Money for Nothing (1932) - Maid
 Josser Joins the Navy (1932) - Polly
 Aren't We All? (1932) - Kitty Lake
 The Bad Companions (1932) - Josie
 White Face (1932) - Janice Harman
 The Maid of the Mountains (1932) - Vittoria
 His Wife's Mother (1932) - Tony
 Happy (1933) - Pauline
 Skipper of the Osprey (1933, Short) - Maggie Cringle
 Letting in the Sunshine (1933) - Jane
 Uncertain Lady (1934) - Myra Spaulding
 The Love Captive (1934) - Valerie Loft
 David Copperfield (1935) - Janet
 The Crimson Circle (1936) - Millie Macroy
 Where's Sally? (1936) - Sally
 Tomorrow We Live (1936) - Patricia Gordon
 The Man in the Mirror (1936) - Miss Blake
 The Man Who Made Diamonds (1937) - Marianne
 Clothes and the Woman (1937) - Schoolmistress
 Brief Ecstasy (1937) - Marjorie
 Under a Cloud (1937) - Judy St. John
 Meet Mr. Penny (1938) - Mrs. Brown
 Murder in Soho (1939) - Woman in Police Station
 Unpublished Story (1942) - Miss Hartley
 They Came to a City (1944) - Mrs. Stritton
 Dead of Night (1945) - Mrs. Craig (segment "Linking Story")
 Frieda (1946) - Mrs. Freeman
 Good-Time Girl (1948) - Mrs. Parsons
 The Blue Lamp (1950) - Woman Driver (uncredited)

References

Bibliography
 Sweet, Matthew. Shepperton Babylon: The Lost Worlds of British Cinema. Faber and Faber, 2005.

External links
 
 

1908 births
2003 deaths
British film actresses
People from Buenos Aires
British stage actresses
Argentine emigrants to the United Kingdom
British expatriate actresses in the United States